Ireland participated in the Eurovision Song Contest 2016 with the song "Sunlight" written by Nicky Byrne, Wayne Hector and Ronan Hardiman. The song was performed by Nicky Byrne, who was internally selected in January 2016 by the Irish broadcaster Raidió Teilifís Éireann (RTÉ) to represent the nation at the 2016 contest in Stockholm, Sweden. "Sunlight" was presented as the Irish entry during the announcement of Byrne's internal selection on 13 January 2016.

Ireland was drawn to compete in the second semi-final of the Eurovision Song Contest which took place on 12 May 2016. Performing during the show in position 7, "Sunlight" was not announced among the top 10 entries of the second semi-final and therefore did not qualify to compete in the final. It was later revealed that Ireland placed fifteenth out of the 18 participating countries in the semi-final with 46 points.

Background

Ireland has won the contest a record seven times in total. The country's first win came in 1970, with then-18-year-old Dana winning with "All Kinds of Everything". Ireland holds the record for being the only country to win the contest three times in a row (in 1992, 1993 and 1994), as well as having the only three-time winner (Johnny Logan, who won in 1980 as a singer, 1987 as a singer-songwriter, and again in 1992 as a songwriter). In 2011 and 2012, Jedward represented the nation for two consecutive years, managing to qualify to the final both times and achieve Ireland's highest position in the contest since 2000, placing eighth in 2011 with the song "Lipstick". However, in 2013, despite managing to qualify to the final, Ryan Dolan and his song "Only Love Survives" placed last in the final. The Irish entries in 2014, "Heartbeat" performed by Can-linn featuring Kasey Smith, and in 2015, "Playing with Numbers" performed by Molly Sterling, both failed to qualify to the final.

The Irish national broadcaster, Raidió Teilifís Éireann (RTÉ), broadcasts the event within Ireland and organises the selection process for the nation's entry. From 2008 to 2015, RTÉ had set up the national final Eurosong to choose both the song and performer to compete at Eurovision for Ireland, with both the public and regional jury groups involved in the selection. For the 2016 Eurovision Song Contest, RTÉ held an internal selection to choose the artist and song to represent Ireland at the contest. This marked the first time that RTÉ internally selected both the artist and song for the contest; previously the broadcaster had only internally selected the artist in 1974, 1975, 2006 and 2007, while the song was chosen in a televised competition. In regards to the internal selection, John McHugh, Head of Entertainment RTÉ Television, stated: "We have a long and proud history with Eurovision, but we've had mixed results over the last few years. Myself and Head of Delegation Michael Kealy took a serious look at our approach, reviewing the entire process and the Eurovision Song Contest itself. The competition is constantly evolving and RTÉ has to be flexible in how we approach it in order to put our best foot forward. Direct selection has proven to be a successful method for other countries and we felt that this year it would give us the best chance at success."

Before Eurovision

Selection procedure
RTÉ confirmed their intentions to participate at the 2016 Eurovision Song Contest on 27 May 2015. On 13 January 2016, the broadcaster announced that they had internally selected Nicky Byrne to represent Ireland in Stockholm. Byrne was a former member of the Irish boy band Westlife and had previously been the Irish spokesperson at the Eurovision Song Contest, revealing the results of the Irish vote between 2013 and 2015. Unconfirmed rumours of Byrne's selection as the Irish contestant were published by Irish media earlier on 7 January 2016.

Along with the announcement that Byrne would represent Ireland on 13 January, the song to be performed by Byrne, "Sunlight", was also released via a lyric video uploaded on YouTube. The song was written by Byrne himself together with Wayne Hector and Ronan Hardiman. Byrne's first live performance of the song took place on 13 February, during the RTÉ One Saturday night programme The Ray D'Arcy Show.

Promotion
Nicky Byrne made several appearances across Europe to specifically promote "Sunlight" as the Irish Eurovision entry. On 21 February 2016, Nicky Byrne performed "Sunlight" during the final of the Ukrainian Eurovision national selection. On 17 April, Byrne performed during the London Eurovision Party, which was held at the Café de Paris venue in London, United Kingdom and hosted by Nicki French and Paddy O'Connell. In late April, Byrne completed promotional activities in the United Kingdom where he appeared on radio programmes and talk shows to promote both his Eurovision song and the release of his album Sunlight.

In addition to his international appearances, Nicky Byrne also completed promotional appearances on RTÉ One programmes in Ireland. Byrne performed "Sunlight" during the final of The Voice of Ireland on 24 April and he gave an interview about his preparations for the Eurovision Song Contest on The Ray D'Arcy Show on 30 April.

At Eurovision

According to Eurovision rules, all nations with the exceptions of the host country and the "Big Five" (France, Germany, Italy, Spain and the United Kingdom) are required to qualify from one of two semi-finals in order to compete for the final; the top ten countries from each semi-final progress to the final. The European Broadcasting Union (EBU) split up the competing countries into six different pots based on voting patterns from previous contests, with countries with favourable voting histories put into the same pot. On 25 January 2016, a special allocation draw was held which placed each country into one of the two semi-finals, as well as which half of the show they would perform in. Ireland was placed into the second semi-final, to be held on 12 May 2016, and was scheduled to perform in the first half of the show.

Once all the competing songs for the 2016 contest had been released, the running order for the semi-finals was decided by the shows' producers rather than through another draw, so that similar songs were not placed next to each other. Ireland was set to perform in position 7, following the entry from Serbia and before the entry from Macedonia.

In Ireland, the two semi-finals were broadcast on RTÉ2 and the final was broadcast on RTÉ One with all three shows featuring commentary by Marty Whelan. The second semi-final and the final were also broadcast via radio on RTÉ Radio 1 with commentary by Neil Doherty and Zbyszek Zalinski. The Irish spokesperson, who announced the top 12-point score awarded by the Irish jury during the final, was Sinéad Kennedy.

Semi-final

Nicky Byrne took part in technical rehearsals on 4 and 7 May, followed by dress rehearsals on 11 and 12 May. This included the jury show on 11 May where the professional juries of each country watched and voted on the competing entries.

The Irish performance featured a band set-up with Nicky Byrne performing together with a drummer, keyboard player and guitarist who were on raised platforms. The LED screens displayed bright red patterns and fireball images of the sun with the stage lighting in red and white. The creative team that worked on producing Ireland's performance was led by Tim Byrne, former Creative Director of Syco Entertainment at Sony Music and included Lee Lodge, whose production credits include the 87th Academy Awards and the MTV Music Video Awards, and Michael Kealy, the Irish Head of Delegation for the Eurovision Song Contest. Byrne was joined on stage by five backing vocalists, some of which were also playing instruments: Janet Grogan, Jay Boland, Ian White, Jennifer Healy and Johan Sundvall.

At the end of the show, Ireland was not announced among the top 10 entries in the second semi-final and therefore failed to qualify to compete in the final. It was later revealed that Ireland placed fifteenth in the semi-final, receiving a total of 46 points: 31 points from the televoting and 15 points from the juries.

Voting
Voting during the three shows was conducted under a new system that involved each country now awarding two sets of points from 1–8, 10 and 12: one from their professional jury and the other from televoting. Each nation's jury consisted of five music industry professionals who are citizens of the country they represent, with their names published before the contest to ensure transparency. This jury judged each entry based on: vocal capacity; the stage performance; the song's composition and originality; and the overall impression by the act. In addition, no member of a national jury was permitted to be related in any way to any of the competing acts in such a way that they cannot vote impartially and independently. The individual rankings of each jury member as well as the nation's televoting results were released shortly after the grand final.

Below is a breakdown of points awarded to Ireland and awarded by Ireland in the second semi-final and grand final of the contest, and the breakdown of the jury voting and televoting conducted during the two shows:

Points awarded to Ireland

Points awarded by Ireland

Detailed voting results
The following members comprised the Irish jury:
 Ken O'Sullivan (jury chairperson)radio presenter
 Caroline Henrymusic associate, production manager 
 Lauren Murphyfreelance music and arts journalist, website music editor
 Jimmy Rainsfordmusician
 Molly Sterlingsinger, songwriter, represented Ireland in the 2015 contest

References

External links 

Official RTÉ Eurovision site

2016
Countries in the Eurovision Song Contest 2016
Eurovision
Eurovision